Folgueras is one of fifteen parishes (administrative divisions) in Pravia, a municipality within the province and autonomous community of Asturias, in northern Spain.

The population is 178 (INE 2011).

Villages and hamlets
 Ablanedo (Ablanéu)
 Folgueras
 Loro (Llouru)
 Sorriba (Surriba)
 Vegafriosa (Veigafriosa)

References

Parishes in Pravia